Kodama Simham is a 1990 Indian Telugu-language revisionist western action film directed by K. Murali Mohana Rao, starring Chiranjeevi, Mohan Babu, Sonam, Radha, and Pran in pivotal roles.
The film was simultaneously dubbed into English as Hunters Of The Indian Treasure and Hindi as Main Hoon Khiladiyon Ka Khiladi. The film received positive reviews and turned out to be a hit, running in nearly 20 centers for over 100 days.

Plot
During crown rule in India criminal activities like extortion, robbery, rape and murder are on the rise. Bharath, is a rough and tough rancher with a heart of gold living in a boomtown with gun-slinging cowboys, dastardly outlaws, swinging saloon doors, one-room jailhouses, and liquor-fuelled shootouts. When Bharat spoils the gambling and prostitution activities of a unchivalrous mayor, His parents are fatally attacked by the mayor's hench men. His dying father advises him to explore the whereabouts of his real parents. He finds his mother in prison because his father was falsely accused of stealing precious royal treasures, and selling them to the British. He finds his father, who had been living as a leader of a group of tribal people involved in guerrilla warfare against the local government, the mayor, and the maharajas. Bharat learns that the mayor, the zamindars along with hooligans like Sudi Gali in fact tried to steal the treasure as well as the kohinoor diamond when they accompanied Bharath's father who was a treasurer with the maharajas, and that he had driven away with it to save it. Bharath retrieves the treasure to save his family's reputation.

Cast
Chiranjeevi as Bharath
Radha as Bijili
Sonam
Mohan Babu as Sudigali
 Satyanarayana as Dharma Dev
 Pran as Mayor Ranjith
 Tiger Prabhakar Gajapati
 Vani Viswanath as bartender
 Ranganath as King
 Allu Ramalingaiah as bar owner
 Bramhanandam as constable
 Gollapudi Maruti Rao as Bharat's father
 Chalapathi Rao as Jailor

Soundtrack 
The music is composed by Raj–Koti. All songs are penned by Veturi.

Reception
Griddaluri Gopalrao of Zamin Ryot gave a positive review for the film on 17 August 1990, praising the performance of Chiranjeevi and the direction.

References

External links
 

1990s Telugu-language films
1990 films
Indian Western (genre) films
1990 Western (genre) films
Films scored by Raj–Koti
British India in fiction
British Raj
Ind
Desi films
Treasure hunt films
Films shot in Colorado
Indian Western (genre) comedy films